The Jerusalem Film Festival is an international film festival held annually in Jerusalem,  It was established in 1984 by the Director of the Jerusalem Cinematheque and Israeli Film Archive, Lia Van Leer, and has since become the main Israeli event for filmmakers and enthusiasts. Over the course of ten days every summer, over 200 films from 60 countries are screened at the Festival, along with a variety of special events, panels, and meetings with prominent local and international filmmakers, as well as professional industry workshops and events.

History

The Festival was established by Israel Prize recipient and founder of the Jerusalem Cinematheque and Israeli Film Archive, Lia Van Leer. After being invited to serve on the jury at the 1983 Cannes Film Festival, Van Leer decided to create Israel's first international film festival. Already in its very first year, the Festival had the honor of hosting key cinematic figures such as  Jeanne Moreau, Lillian Gish, Warren Beatty and John Schlesinger.

Since 2005, the Festival has included the Pitch Point,  a platform for Israeli artists to present their full-length feature projects in stages of development and production, to select members of the international film industry. This allows local filmmakers to create international networks of communication, expand financing and resources, and promote co-productions and potential collaborations.

Festival Competitions 

The Festival spotlights Israeli cinema, with competitions carrying the largest awards, exposes local art to international journalists and professionals, screens Israeli premieres along with retrospectives and new restorations of the finest Israeli films. Through these competitions, nearly 10 million dollars in prizes have been awarded to Israeli filmmakers in the fields of feature, documentary, student, and short films.

Awards for Israeli Cinema 
The Festival awards prizes for best international films. Other prizes are the In the Spirit of Freedom Award for cinematic pieces dealing with man's constant strife for justice and freedom, the Intersections prize competition for experimental film, the International Debut Award, the Jewish Experience Award for films dealing with issues of Jewish identity and history, and the Wim van Leer Award for High School Students.

List of Wolgin / Haggiag Prize Recipients for Full-Length Feature Films

Opening Event at Sultan's Pool 
The Jerusalem Film Festival holds its traditional opening event at Sultan's Pool in the presence of film enthusiasts, public dignitaries, and invited guests.

See also
Culture of Israel
Cinema of Israel

References

External links
Official site

Film festivals in Israel
Festivals in Jerusalem
Tourist attractions in Jerusalem
1984 establishments in Israel
Film festivals established in 1984